James Martin Delahunt (born 1962) is a Scottish sports presenter and newspaper columnist.

Career
Delahunt joined Setanta Sports in August 2006 after more than eight years as anchorman of STV's sport programme Scotsport. Setanta Sports ceased broadcasting in June 2009.

Delahunt had presented Scotsport, all of STV's live football, and some rugby coverage since 1998 and had been a presenter on the channel since 1990.
On 17 September 2008, Delahunt returned to STV for a short period as a freelance anchor of the station's UEFA Champions League highlights shows. In 2010 he began reporting on Scottish Premier League games for ESPN.

In 2010 he was announced as the new 'anchorman' of Radio Clyde's Superscoreboard football phone in programme for season 2010–11. In March 2015, Delahunt resigned from his job at Radio Clyde after being found guilty of drunk driving.

He writes a column for the Scottish Sun, focusing on betting tips for football and horse racing, one of his main passions since childhood.

References 

Alumni of Glasgow Caledonian University
Scottish television presenters
STV News newsreaders and journalists
Living people
People from Saltcoats
People educated at St Andrew's Academy, Saltcoats
1962 births
Scottish radio presenters